TelQuel (slogan: Morocco as it is), is a French-language Moroccan weekly news magazine. It is privately owned, and is known for its resolute opposition to Islamist ideology in Morocco.

History and profile
TelQuel was founded in 2001 by Ahmed Benchemsi. It provides new-related articles. 

The magazine has been repeatedly subjected to harassment and pressures from the Moroccan government. Both Benchemsi and Boukhari were convicted in 2005 on charges of defamation, in what the RSF described as a political trial.

On 1 August 2009, the Moroccan government seized an edition of TelQuel, following its inclusion of an opinion poll conducted jointly with French newspaper Le Monde and looking at the performance of King Mohammed VI over the first ten years of his reign. Although 91% viewed his performance favourably, the authorities considered this to be an unsuitable topic for coverage and promptly banned publication of the survey, provoking a furious reaction from the press and Web users.

TelQuel started a Moroccan Arabic edition, Nichane. In 2010, however, it went out of business following government pressure on companies to withdraw advertising.

Editors-in-chief
Selma Mhaoud September 2001 – January 2002 
Driss Ksikes February 2002 - July 2006 
 Karim Boukhari September 2006 – January 2013
Fahd Iraqi, January 2013 – May 2014
Abdallah Tourabi, June 2014 – present

See also
 List of magazines in Morocco

References

2001 establishments in Morocco
French-language magazines
Magazines established in 2001
Magazines published in Morocco
Weekly news magazines
News magazines published in Africa